Among those who were born in the London Borough of Barking and Dagenham, or have dwelt within the borders of the modern borough are:

A
Les Allen – former footballer and manager
Tony Adams – footballer

B
Giles Barnes – professional footballer for Vancouver Whitecaps
Adam Barrett – professional footballer for Southend United F.C.
 Rev. Abraham Blackborne – one of the longest-serving vicars of Dagenham
 Mark Blackhall – professional footballer 
 Jamie Borthwick – actor
 Billy Bragg – alternative rock musician
Sir Trevor Brooking – former professional footballer with West Ham
 Max Bygraves – musician, moved to the area in 1945

C
 George Carey – Lord Carey of Clifton Archbishop of Canterbury
 Henry Chilver (Lord Chilver) – vice-chancellor of Cranfield Institute of Technology; Chair of Milton Keynes Development Corporation
 Captain James Cook – married in Barking in 1762

D
 Devlin – Grime MC
 Françoise Dior – French-born Nazi, arrested 1967
 Diversity – street dance group who won Britain's Got Talent in 2009
 Job Drain – soldier, awarded the Victoria Cross for bravery in 1914

E
 David Howell Evans (aka "The Edge") – popular music musician.
 Ethelburga (d. c.680 AD) – first Abbess of Barking Abbey
 Daisy Evans – singer, past member of S Club Juniors

F
 John Farnham – Australian singer; born in Dagenham
 Mark Frost (born 1962) – cricketer
 Nick Frost – actor, comedian and screenwriter
 Elizabeth Fry – prison reformer

G
 Paul Gbegbaje – Britain's Got Talent 2011 finalist
 Stephen Gray – cricketer

H
 Eva Hart – child survivor of RMS Titanic disaster
 Danny-Boy Hatchard – actor
 Barry Hearn – sporting events promoter; Chairman of Leyton Orient F.C. and the Professional Darts Corporation
 William Hope – soldier, awarded the Victoria Cross in 1857 for bravery during Crimean War
 Rochelle Humes – television personality and singer
 Neil Humphreys – author
 Myke Hurley  – podcaster and co-founder of podcast network Relay FM

I
IMD Legion – street dance troupe, contestants on Got To Dance and Britain's Got Talent

J
 Phill Jupitus – comedian, grew up in Barking
 Elliot Justham – professional footballer

K
 Ross Kemp – actor, born in Barking
 Paul Konchesky – footballer, born in Barking

L
 Jason Leonard – professional rugby union player, 2003 Rugby World Cup winner
 Vera Lynn – voted the most popular singer in 1939
Lethbridge ,Charlotte - a young writer , published a book named “Lucy and the time portal”

M
 Megan McKenna – reality television personality
 McLean – singer
 Kevin Mitchell – boxer
 Bobby Moore – former professional footballer with West Ham; 1966 World Cup winner as captain of England
 Dudley Moore – international film star and musician
 Dean Marney – professional footballer with Burnley F.C.
Yunus Musah - professional footballer with Valencia CF and USMNT

O
Conor Okus –  professional footballer
Hank Osasuna – actor and performance artist who grew up in Chadwell Heath

P
 Sara Pascoe – writer, stand-up comedian and actress
 Joseph Pearce – biographer, writer and professor; lives in New Hampshire, United States
 Stevo Pearce – owner of Some Bizzare Records
 Martin Peters – footballer, World Cup winner in 1966 with England
 Daniel Potts – professional footballer for Luton Town
 Darren Pratley – footballer currently playing for Bolton Wanderers

Q
 Zain Qaiser – "most prolific cyber criminal to be sentenced in the UK"

R
 Alf Ramsey – 1966 World Cup winning football manager with England
 Richard of Barking – Abbot of Westminster (died 1246)
 Jo Richardson – former Member of Parliament for Barking; Shadow Spokesman for Women's Rights, 1983–1992
 Jesse Roast – footballer

S
 Brian Saah – footballer, born in Rush Green
 Sandie Shaw – singer, won Eurovision Song Contest in 1967
 Anne Shelton – singing star of the 1940s and 1950s
 Stacey Solomon – 2009 X-Factor finalist; winner of the British version of I'm a Celebrity, Get Me Out of Here in 2010
 Jessamy Stoddart – stage and television actress

T

 Daniel Tammet – writer 
 John Terry – former professional footballer
 Paul Terry – former professional footballer
 The Tremeloes – band formed by classmates Alan Howard and Brian Poole
 Dave Trott – former Chairman and Executive Creative Director of The Gate London, copywriter, blogger and author
 Wes Thomas – professional footballer with Oxford United F.C.

V
 Terry Venables – former professional footballer and manager
 Sir Cornelius Vermuyden – 17th-century Dutch drainage engineer; contracted by the Essex Sewer Commissioners to repair breaches in the Thames riverbank at Dagenham

W
 King William I – stayed at Barking Abbey in 1066 and 1067 while the Tower of London was being constructed
 Norma Winstone – jazz singer
 Richard Wisker – actor, singer
 Mary Wollstonecraft – early feminist

Z
 Bobby Zamora – professional footballer with Brighton & Hove Albion F.C.

References

Bibliography

Barking and Dagenham